Jack White (born Horst Nußbaum, 2 September 1940) is a German composer, producer and former footballer.

Born in Cologne, White developed an interest in both football and music in his childhood, but initially chose footballing as a career. He played professionally for six years, then chose to play at an amateur level while pursuing a career in music. As a singer, his work was popular in his native country and other German-speaking nations, but the majority of his success came from his production work on international records.

In his music career, White has created 25 of his own records, and is credited on 2512 other records, including 870 production credits. Some of the most notable artists he has worked with are Laura Branigan, Barry Manilow and David Hasselhoff. As most of his work was with English speaking musicians, White changed his name to make it easier to deal with English-speaking stars and their managers. In the international market, White’s productions have sold millions of copies, earning Music Recording Certification awards. Personally, White has won several European music awards for his own work and influence on the international music scene, including the German Golden Tuning Fork, and the RTL Group Lion.

White created several record labels throughout his career. White Records, Jack White Productions, and Gloriella Music, from which he continued to work with and produce for German and international artists. Currently, White Records and Gloriella Music are still operating, although without White in any operational sense.

Officially, White retired from the stage in 2014, with his last song being performed at ‘The Summer Festival at the Lake’, hosted by Florian Silbereisen.

Football career 

Before getting into music, White began playing professional football at the age of 20 for FC Viktoria Köln, and continued playing for six years (1961–1966) when he then decided to play at an amateur level with Tennis Borussia Berlin for ten years while pursuing his music career. As athletes usually struggle with new careers post-retirement, he remained with the club for the opportunity to resume his professional contract. He represented 5 different clubs over his career, mainly playing in the right-midfielder or right-back positions.

White first joined FC Viktoria Koln when he was scouted by legendary coach Hennes Weisweiler in the 1961–62 season of the Oberliga West, staying for two seasons, where the team finished tenth in the 1961–62 season, and eighth in the 1962–63 season. Because of the Bundesliga's introduction the following year, the club was relegated to Regionalliga West. He then transferred to FK Pirmasens in the 1963–64 season of the Regionalliga Sudwest, where he played the most games and scored the most goals for a single club, along with finishing second that season. After his transfer to TSC Zweibrücken, White also released his first single as a musician, and began to transition to music.

He finished his professional career at PSV Eindhoven, coming eighth in the 1965–66 season. He then continued an amateur career at Tennis Borussia Berlin for 10 years while furthering his music career. From 1992 to 1995, White served as their club president.

During this time, White financially supported the club in an attempt to bring it back to the top flight of German Football. During his time there as a player, the club was separated from the Bundesliga due to being in Berlin, and not West Germany, and thus was not allowed to play at the same level it did before the World War II. He loaned a total of 5.8 million Marks throughout his presidency, and was eventually succeeded by Göttinger Gruppe, a now bankrupt investment group. The club has struggled since, and has mostly sat in either the fifth (or fourth) tier of German football, NOVF Oberliga Nord.

Known statistics

Music career 
White began as a singer in his native Germany in the late 1960s, and found local success performing at bars.  At the same time, White also began to produce and write music for other German musicians, and had his first hit, "Schöne Maid", sung by Tony Marshall, in 1971. As his popularity in Germany increased, he began to work with international artists, and produced for a wide range of artists, establishing himself as a producer. White decided to change his name after seeing the success that Roy Black (real name Gerhard Höllerich) had from changing his name in the international market, and so he decided upon Jack White with the recommendation from his agent at the time. Among the songs he produced or co-produced for the international market were Laura Branigan's "Gloria" (1982), Solitaire" (1983), "How Am I Supposed To Live Without You" (1983), "Self Control" (1984) and "The Lucky One" (1984), as well as Jermaine Jackson and Pia Zadora's "When the Rain Begins to Fall" (1984). He also worked with Paul Anka, Barry Manilow ("You're Looking Hot Tonight"), Engelbert Humperdinck and Audrey Landers. He wrote several hit songs with Mark Spiro, including Zadora's "Let's Dance Tonight" (1984) and Hazell Dean's "Who's Leaving Who" (1988). He also worked with Anne Murray, producing tracks on her 1986 album Something to Talk About and all tracks on her 1987 album Harmony. White also produced the soundtrack to the 1984 film Voyage of the Rock Aliens.

In the 1980s, White worked with David Hasselhoff. White's production work with Hasselhoff consisted of four albums, but the most popular song was "Looking for Freedom". The record experienced great success both in America, and in Germany, was used in protests against the Berlin Wall and the separation of East and West Germany. In 1989, Hasselhoff performed this song on top of the Brandenburg Gate in Berlin, and two years later, the Soviet Union collapsed and the Berlin Wall was destroyed. The song remains popular in German speaking nations, as its political impact created a lasting impact in its audience. The song has also been analysed in philosophical studies discussing the nature of freedom in the modern world.

In 1984, White founded his own record label, White Records, and published his work through the label, continuing to work with German and English speaking artists as a songwriter and producer. White was also director of Jack White Productions (JWP AG), which was established in 1998. In 2006, White was terminated from JWP AG, due to a "breach in trust", between White and chairman at the time, Thomas M. Stein. In June 2010, JWP AG became known as 7days entertainment AG, and then filed for bankruptcy in April 2014. The chairman of JWP AG, Thomas M. Stein claimed that a breach of trust was the reason behind the dismissal. In 2012, Munich based record label Telamo purchased White Records and now works with indie German musicians to produce and write new music. 

In 2008, White re-entered the production market through a new label, Gloriella Music, where he continued to produce and write for artists. After his retirement in 2014, he sold distributing rights to Sony Music, although he remains involved with Gloriella, as an executive.

In January 2014, White announced on The Great Festival of the Best that he was going to perform a final time before retirement. Then in May, White made his last public performance as a musician, at a festival hosted by Florian Silbereisen called The Summer Festival by the Lake, where he played his own music, along with covers of his productions, and a final "Last Song". Since then, he has officially stopped performing, and has become less involved in the music scene. Throughout his career, White still made and performed his own music, and his international fame resulted in his own work becoming successful in German speaking nations. White is credited on 2513 records over his career and has created 25 of his own.

Style of music 
As a producer, White worked with many international pop artists, especially the subgenre of synth-pop that was very popular in the 1980s. The development of synthesisers and music production software influenced White’s music, as the majority of early producers in the 1980s developed the foundations of electronic dance music.

In the German market, White's work mainly followed the same style of pop, although his early success came from writing folk style songs, and these remain some of his most popular songs in Germany, such as "Schöne Maid".

White's personal work is the same style as his German folk, as he wrote most of his own music at the beginning of his career, before finding his international style. White did not use synthesisers or software often in his own music, such as Jack White at the Piano, recorded only using the piano and his voice.

Awards 
White's production work internationally has earned various Music Recording Certification awards for surpassing sales milestones in different countries, both in the German and English market. The European market has given the most awards to these works due to the smaller sales figures required to achieve the milestones compared to the North American market.

Production awards 

 Branigan (Laura Branigan) – 2 Gold awards, 1 in America and 1 in Canada
 Branigan 2 (Laura Branigan) – 1 Gold award in America
 Self Control (Laura Branigan) – 2 Platinum (Canada and US), 2 Gold (Germany and Hong Kong), 1 Silver (United Kingdom)
 Crazy for You (David Hasselhoff) – 6 Platinum Awards (2 in Austria, 1 in Germany, 3 in Switzerland)
 David (David Hasselhoff) – 4 Platinum Awards (2 in Austria, 1 in Germany, 1 in Switzerland)
 Everybody Sunshine (David Hasselhoff) – 3 Gold (1 in Austria, 1 in Germany, and 1 in Switzerland)
 Looking for Freedom (David Hasselhoff) – 5 Platinum (1 in Austria and Germany, 3 in Switzerland)

Personal awards 
The Golden Tuning Fork (Goldene Stimmgabel) was a German music award won by White in 1992 was awarded for high record sales between October 1991 to June 1992, specifically for Everybody Sunshine. White was also awarded an honorary Lion by the RTL Group for his work in the European music industry as a producer.

References

External links
 
 

1940 births
Living people
German record producers
German songwriters
Musicians from Cologne
German footballers
FC Viktoria Köln players
PSV Eindhoven players
Tennis Borussia Berlin players
Association football midfielders
German footballers needing infoboxes
Footballers from Cologne
FK Pirmasens players